Schizotheca may refer to:
Schizotheca (bryozoan), a genus of bryozoans in the family Phidoloporidae
Schizotheca, a genus of plants in the family Hydrocharitaceae, considered synonymous with Thalassia
Schizotheca, an illegitimate name for a genus of plants in the family Amaranthaceae, considered synonymous with Atriplex